Gazi station is a historic station in Ankara, Turkey. Built in 1926 by the Turkish State Railways, the station building is notable for its Turkish Neoclassical architectural style, designed by Turkish architect Burhaneddin Tamcı. Situated next to the Atatürk Forest Farm, the station was a stop on the Ankara suburban and Ankara-Polatlı Regional trains until 2016 when all train service (except high-speed) was suspended within Ankara. The station platforms are currently being rebuilt as part of TCDD's Başkentray project. The new station is expected to open on 12 April 2018.

References

Railway stations in Ankara Province
Railway stations opened in 1926
1926 establishments in Turkey
First Turkish National architecture
Etimesgut District